Leslie Margolis is an American author and novelist, whose works are more targeted towards children. Her book, Boys Are Dogs, was adapted into a film entitled Zapped, by Disney. She currently lives in Los Angeles, California.

Bibliography

Annabelle Unleashed series
This five-part series includes:
Boys Are Dogs published in 2008 and adapted into audio book format.
adapted into the Disney Channel Original Movie titled Zapped starring Zendaya and Spencer Boldman 2014
Girls Acting Catty published in 2009
Everybody Bugs Out published in 2011
One Tough Chick published in 2013
Monkey Business published September 2014

Maggie Brooklyn Mystery series
Girl's Best Friend published in 2010
Vanishing Acts published in 2012
Secrets at the Chocolate Mansion published in 2013

Stand-alone novels
Fix published 3 October 2006
Price of Admission published 1 February 2007
If I Were You published 12 May 2015
We Are Party People published 3 October 2017
Ghosted published 23 October 2018

Co-operative projects
21 Proms published 1 March 2007
First Kiss (Then Tell) published 1 December 2007
Lucky Dog: Twelve Tales of Rescued Dogs published in 2014

References

External links

Official website

American children's writers
American science fiction writers
Writers from Los Angeles
American women children's writers
Women science fiction and fantasy writers
American women novelists
Living people
Year of birth missing (living people)
Place of birth missing (living people)
21st-century American women